HockeyNight is a Danish ice hockey program, that presents games from the Danish ice hockey league, Metal Ligaen. The program is broadcast on TV2 sport. Ice hockey expert Jimmy Bøjgaard and former ice hockey player, Lasse Degn are commentators.

Ice hockey in Denmark
Sports television in Denmark